Beat This: A Hip-Hop History is a 1984 BBC documentary film about hip-hop culture, directed by Dick Fontaine. The cast includes Afrika Bambaataa, DJ Kool Herc — the film includes footage from Herc's original dance parties — The Cold Crush Brothers, Jazzy Jay, Brim Fuentes, and The Dynamic Rockers. It is narrated by Imhotep Gary Byrd. Originally part of the Arena television series, it was among the first crop of documentaries about hip-hop.

References

External links 
 
 EntertainingThings.com Review

Documentary films about hip hop music and musicians
1984 television films
1984 films
British television films
BBC television documentaries
1980s English-language films
1980s British films